The English-language surname Healy is in use by three separate ancestral lines of people from Ireland.

When Irish people began to anglicise their names, two separate clans adopted the English-language surname of "Healy". There was the Ó hÉilidhe clan from Connaught and the Ó hÉalaighthe clan from Munster.

Many different spellings of the surname exist including Haly, Haley, Haily, Healey, Hely, O'Healey and O'Haly.

Notable people with the surname Healy
 A. J. Healy (Alan James Healy; born 1969), Irish children's writer
 Aidan Healy, Irish hurler who played for Kerry and Abbeydorney
 Albert Frederick Healy (1873–1942), Canadian lawyer and politician, member of the House of Commons of Canada for Essex North (1923–1925)
 Alex Healy (racing driver) (born 1989), Canadian Touring Car racing driver
 Alice F. Healy (born 1946), American psychologist
 Alyssa Healy (born 1990), Australian women's cricketer
 Anna Healy, Baroness Healy of Primrose Hill (born 1955), British Labour politician, member of the House of Lords
 Anne Healy (born 1939), American artist, founding member of A.I.R. Gallery
 Ben Healy (disambiguation) (born 1999), Irish rugby union player
 Bernadine Healy (1944–2011), American physician
 Bernard Healy, member of the Los Angeles City Council (1904–1909)
 Bill Healy (William Raymond Healy; 1924–2010), American college football player
 Brendan Healy (born 1983), American lacrosse player
 Brendan Healy (comedian) (1956–2016), British entertainer
 Brian Healy (disambiguation), multiple people
 Cahir Healy (1877–1970), Irish politician
 Cahir Healy (dual player) (born 1986), Irish Gaelic footballer and hurler
 Catherine Healy (disambiguation), multiple people
 Cecil Healy (1881–1918), Australian swimmer
 Charles Healy (1883–?, date of death unknown), American water polo player
 Charlie Healy (disambiguation), multiple people
 Chip Healy (1947–2019), American football player
 Christine Healy (born 1950), American actress
 Cian Healy (born 1987), Irish rugby player
 Colin Healy (born 1980), Irish footballer
 Craig Healy (born 1957), American Olympic sailor
 Damien Healy, Irish Gaelic footballer
 Dan Healy (disambiguation), multiple people
 Daniel Healy (born 1974), Australian rules footballer
 Danny Healy-Rae (born 1954), Irish Independent politician, Teachta Dála for the Kerry constituency (from 2016)
 David Healy (disambiguation), multiple people
 Denis Healy (Irish politician), Fianna Fáil member of the Seanad Éireann (1934–1936, 1938–1948)
 Dermot Healy (1947–2014), Irish novelist and playwright
 Dermot Healy (hurling manager) (born 1948), Irish hurling manager
 Dick Healy (1921–2013), Australian rugby league footballer
 Don Healy (born 1936), American footballer
 Dorian Healy (born 1962), British actor
 Dorothy Healy (disambiguation), multiple people
 Dorothy M. Healy (1914–1990), American educator, historian, and curator
 Eamonn Healy (born 1958), American chemistry professor
 Ed Healy (born 1973), American role-playing game designer
 Edward Healy (1869–1954), Member of Parliament in New Zealand (1928–1935)
 Edwin Healy (1909–1995), Australian cricketer
 Egyptian Healy (1866–1899), pitcher in Major League Baseball
 Eliza Healy (1846–1919), American educator
 Eloise Klein Healy (born 1943), American poet
 Eric Healy (1888–1954), Australian cricketer
 Erin Healy, American politician
 Felix Healy (born 1955), Northern Irish footballer
 Fergal Healy (born 1977), Irish hurler who played for Craughwell and Galway
 Frances Healy (born 1970), Irish actress, comedian, radio personality, and TV presenter
 Francis Healy (disambiguation), multiple people
 Frank Healy (born 1962), British guitarist
 Gene Healy (born 1970), American political pundit, journalist and editor
 George Peter Alexander Healy (1813–1894), American painter
 Gerald Healy (1885–1946), Australian cricketer
 Gerard Healy (born 1961), Australian rules footballer
 Gerry Healy (1913–1989), Irish Trotskyist activist
 Gertrude Healy (1894-1984), Australian violinist, conductor, music educator
 Glenn Healy (born 1962), Canadian ice hockey player
 Graham Healy (born 1956), Australian politician, member of the Legislative Assembly of Queensland (1992–2001)
 Greg Healy (born 1965), Australian rules footballer who played for Melbourne in the VFL/AFL
 Gus Healy (Augustine A. Healy; 1904–1987), Irish Fianna Fáil politician, Lord Mayor of Cork (1964–1965, 1975–1976)
 Harold H. Healy Jr. (1921–2007), American lawyer, President of the Union Internationale des Avocats (1979–1981)
 Howard R. Healy (1899–1942), US Navy officer
 Ian Healy (born 1964), Australian cricketer
 Jack Healy (died 1972), American actor and the manager of boxer Rocky Graziano
 Jack H. Healy (born 1929), American geophysicist
 Jackie Healy-Rae (1931–2014), Irish politician
 Jaime Aleman Healy (born 1953), Panamanian lawyer, businessman and diplomat, Ambassador of Panama to the United States (2009–2011)
 James Andrew Healy (1895–1983), American World War I flying ace
 James Augustine Healy (1830–1900), American Roman Catholic priest and the second bishop of Portland, Maine
 James Healy (disambiguation), multiple people
 Janet Healy, American film producer
 Jeremy Healy (born 1962), British DJ
 Jerramiah Healy (born 1950), Mayor of Jersey City
 Joe Healy (born 1986), English football midfielder
 John Healy (disambiguation), multiple people
 Jonathan Healy (politician) (born 1945), American politician, member of the Massachusetts House of Representatives (1971–1993)
 Joseph D. Healy (1912–1971), American explorer
 Joseph Healy (1776–1861), American politician
 Juan Ruiz Healy, Mexican-American journalist
 Julie Healy, Australian model
 Katherine Healy (born 1969), American principal ballerina
 Kevin Healy (1909–2001), Australian communist activist and trade unionist
 Kevin Healy (footballer) (born 1937), Australian footballer
 Kieran Healy, Irish sociologist
 Leo H. Healy (1894–1962), American lawyer
 Leo Healy (1890–1939), Australian footballer
 Marcia Healy (1904–1972), American film actress
 Margaret Healy, Irish singer/songwriter
 Mark Healy (Gaelic footballer) (born 1960), Irish Gaelic footballer
Martin J. Healy (1883–1942), American politician
 Mary Healy (disambiguation), multiple people
 Matt Healy (disambiguation), multiple people
 Maurice Healy (1859–1923), Irish nationalist politician
 Maurice Healy (campaigner) (1933–2020), British consumer campaigner
 Maurice Healy (writer) (1887–1943), Irish lawyer and author
 Michael Healy (disambiguation), multiple people
 Nathan Healy (basketball) (born 1990), American basketball player
 Ned R. Healy (1905–1977), American politician, member of the U.S. House of Representatives (1945–1947)
 Niall Healy (born 1985), Irish hurler
 Noëlle Healy (born 1991), Irish Gaelic footballer
 Paddy Healy (1922–1983), Irish hurler and Gaelic footballer
 Paddy Healy (St Mary's hurler), Irish hurler
 Pamela Healy (born 1963), American sailor
 Patricia Healy (born 1959), American actress
 Patrick Healy (disambiguation), multiple people
 Paul M. Healy, American Professor of Business Administration at Harvard Business School (since 1998)
 Peadar Healy (born 1963), Irish Gaelic football player and manager
 Phil Healy (born 1994), Irish sprinter
 Randolph Healy (born 1956), Irish poet and publisher
 Raymond J. Healy (1907–1997), American science fiction anthologist
 Robert Healy (disambiguation), multiple people
 Roy Healy (1915–1968), American rocket scientist
 Ryan Healy (born 1983), American mixed martial artist
 Ryon Healy (born 1992), American baseball player
 Sam Healy (born 1976), Australian actress
 Sarah Healy (born 2001), Irish middle-distance runner
 Scott Healy, American musician
 Séamus Healy (born 1950), Irish politician
 Sean Healy, American artist
 Shane Healy (born 1968), Irish Olympic middle-distance runner
 Shay Healy (born 1942), Irish songwriter, broadcaster and journalist
 Siobhan Healy (born 1976), Scottish artist 
 Steve Healy, Australian sporting administrator and lawyer, President of Tennis Australia 2010–2017
 Susan D. Healy, British biology professor at St. Andrews University, specialist in bird and animal cognitive behaviour
 Ted Healy (1896–1937), American vaudeville performer
 Terry Healy (1921–2009), Australian footballer
 Terry Healy (politician) (born 1981), Australian politician, member of the Western Australian Legislative Assembly from 2017
 Thomas Healy (disambiguation), multiple people
 Timothy Healy (disambiguation), multiple people
 Tom Healy (disambiguation), multiple people
 Tucka Healy, American soccer player and Google employee
 Una Healy (born 1981), Irish singer with The Saturdays
 William Healy (disambiguation), multiple people
 Yvonne Healy, Irish storyteller

Fictional characters
 Alex Healy, in the BBC soap opera Eastenders
 Benjamin Healy, in the film Problem Child, Junior's dad
 Mike Healy, in the TV series Oz
 Sam Healy, in the Netflix series Orange Is the New Black
 Wendy Healy, in the novel and TV series Lipstick Jungle

See also
 Healey (surname)
 Heal (surname)
 Earl of Donoughmore, a title in the Peerage of Ireland
 Healy Baumgardner (born 1979), American political advisor
 Healy family

English-language surnames
Anglicised Irish-language surnames
Surnames of Irish origin